Arthur Targez (22 November 1896 – 30 December 1976) was a Belgian racing cyclist. He rode in the 1924 & 1925 Tour de France.

References

External links
 

1896 births
1976 deaths
Belgian male cyclists